The Women's team sprint competition at the FIS Nordic World Ski Championships 2021 was held on 28 February 2021.

Results

Semifinals

Semifinal A
The semifinal was started at 11:28.

Semifinal B
The semifinal was started at 11:00.

Final
The final was started at 13:00.

References

Women's team sprint